The 1960–61 Scottish Division One was won by Rangers, who finished one point ahead of nearest rival Kilmarnock. Clyde and Ayr United finished 17th and 18th respectively and were relegated to the 1961-62 Second Division.

League table

Results

References

1
Scottish Division One seasons
Scot